The Dean House is a historic house off U.S. Route 165 in Portland, Arkansas.  The -story house was designed by architect Charles L. Thompson and built c. 1910.  Stylistically, it is a Creole cottage, a simple rectangular shape mounted in a foundation with brick piers.  The roof extends over a wraparound porch, which is supported by Tuscan columns.  The roof is pierced by a pair of gabled dormers that are decorated with fish-scale shingles.

The house was listed on the National Register of Historic Places in 1982.

See also
Pugh House (Portland, Arkansas), another Thompson-designed house next door
National Register of Historic Places listings in Ashley County, Arkansas

References

Houses on the National Register of Historic Places in Arkansas
Houses completed in 1910
Houses in Ashley County, Arkansas
National Register of Historic Places in Ashley County, Arkansas
1910 establishments in Arkansas
Creole cottage architecture in the United States